The enzyme glucosylglycerol 3-phosphatase (EC 3.1.3.69) catalyzes the reaction

2-O-(α-Dglucosyl)-sn-glycerol-3-phosphate + H2O = 2-O-(α-D-glucopyranosyl)glycerol + phosphate

This enzyme belongs to the family of hydrolases, specifically those acting on phosphoric monoester bonds.  The systematic name is 2-O-(α-D-glucopyranosyl)-sn-glycerol-3-phosphate phosphohydrolase. This enzyme is also called salt tolerance protein A, StpA.

References

 
 
 

EC 3.1.3
Enzymes of unknown structure